Söğütçük can refer to the following villages in Turkey:

 Söğütçük, Çine
 Söğütcük, Gölpazarı
 Söğütcük, Ilgaz
 Söğütcük, Korkuteli
 Söğütçük, Savaştepe